Matteo is the Italian form of the given name Matthew. Another form is Mattia. The Hebrew meaning of Matteo is "gift of god". Matteo can also be used as a patronymic surname, often in the forms of de Matteo, De Matteo or DeMatteo, meaning "[descendant] of Matteo".

Given name Matteo 
 Matteo Bandello, Italian novelist
 Matteo Berrettini (born 1996), Italian tennis player
 Matteo Bisiani, Italian archer
 Matteo Maria Boiardo, Italian Renaissance poet
 Matteo Carcassi, famous guitarist and composer
 Matteo Fedele (born 1992), Swiss footballer
 Matteo Ferrari, Italian football player who currently plays for Montreal Impact
 Matteo Goffriller, renowned 18th-century Italian cello maker
 Matteo Guendouzi, French football player
 Matteo Guidicelli (born 1990), Filipino actor, model, and singer
 Mateo Kovačić, professional footballer
 Matteo Lane (born 1986), American comedian
 Matteo Mantero (born 1974), Italian politician
 Matteo Messina Denaro, Italian criminal. Was on the top 10 most wanted list of the world
 Matteo Palotta, 18th-century Italian composer
 Matteo Perez d'Aleccio, Italian painter of devotional, historical and maritime subjects
 Matteo Renzi, Italian Prime Minister
 Matteo Ricci, Italian Catholic missionary in China
 Matteo Salvini, Italian politician
 Matteo Sereni, Italian football goalkeeper
 Matteo Stefanini, Italian rower
 Matteo Tosatto, Italian cyclist who rides for Quick Step-Innergetic in the UCI ProTour
 Matteo Vittucci, Italian-American dancer, known professionally as Matteo

Surname Matteo, DeMatteo or De Matteo 
 Dominic Matteo (born 1974), Scottish footballer
 Drea de Matteo (born 1972), American actress
 Frank Matteo (1896–1983), American football player
 Felice DeMatteo (1866–1929), Italian-American composer and bandmaster
 Ivano De Matteo (born 1966), Italian director, screenwriter and actor
 Salvatore T. DeMatteo (1911–2003), New York politician and judge

See also 
 Mattei (disambiguation)
 Matthew (name)
 Don Matteo, Italian TV serial

Italian masculine given names
Surnames from given names